is a feminine Japanese given name. Notable people with the name include:

 (born 1951), Japanese manga artist
 (born 1946), Japanese volleyball player

Japanese feminine given names